Jacques Legendre may refer to:

 Jacques Legendre (Canadian politician), Canadian former Ottawa politician
 Jacques Legendre (French politician) (born 1941), French politician and member of the Senate of France